Dingmans Falls is a waterfall located in Dingmans Ferry in Delaware Township, Pennsylvania near the Silverthread Falls.  It has a vertical drop of 39.6 m (130 ft). Both Silverthread Falls and Dingmans Falls are visible from a handicap-accessible trail. The trail begins at the parking lot for the Dingmans Falls Visitor Center.

See also
Bushkill Falls
Silverthread Falls

References

External links
Delaware Water Gap Visitor Centers

External links

National Park Service official website

Pocono Mountains
Protected areas of Pike County, Pennsylvania
Cascade waterfalls
Waterfalls of Pike County, Pennsylvania
Delaware Water Gap National Recreation Area